Union and Progress Party or Unity and Progress Party was a political party in constitutional period  Persia.

In the 1909 Persian legislative election, they won 4 seats and allied with the Moderate Socialists Party against Democrat Party.

The party's line had little resemblance to that of the Young Turks and contained some socialist demands. Most of the party's supporters were active in the countrysides.

References

1908 establishments in Iran
Defunct socialist parties in Iran
Political parties established in 1908
Political parties in Qajar Iran